The Sărdăneşti Power Station will be one of the largest electricity producers in Romania, having 4 groups of 175 MW each totalling an installed capacity of 700 MW and an electricity generation capacity of around 5.3 TW/year.

The power plant will be situated in the Gorj County (South-Western Romania) on the banks of the Jiu River in Sărdăneşti. The construction of the power plant will begin in 2009 and it will be finished in 2013 at a total cost of US$ 1.3 billion.

See also

 List of power stations in Romania

References

Coal-fired power stations in Romania
Proposed coal-fired power stations
Proposed power stations in Romania